Adclarkia is a genus of air-breathing land snails, terrestrial pulmonate gastropod mollusks in the family Camaenidae.

The generic name Adclarkia is named after local conservationist Adam Clark.

Species 
Species within the genus Adclarkia include:
 Adclarkia cameroni Stanisic, 2010
 Adclarkia dawsonensis Stanisic, 1996 - type species of the genus Adclarkia
 Adclarkia dulacca Stanisic, 2010

References 

Camaenidae
Gastropod genera